Pekka Halonen (23 September 1865 – 1 December 1933) was a Finnish painter of landscapes and people in the national romantic and Realist styles.

Biography

Pekka Halonen was born on 23 September 1865 in Linnasalmi, Lapinlahti, Finland, the son of Olli Halonen, a farmer, and Wilhelmina Halonen (née Uotinen). Halonen's father was himself an amateur artist who not only ran the farm, but also worked as a decorative painter on commissions from churches in neighbouring districts. Halonen often accompanied his father on these painting trips and was thus introduced into the craft of painting.

He studied in Helsinki at the Art Society's Drawing School for four years. He graduated with good grades and won a scholarship to study abroad. He went in 1890 to Paris, where he first studied at the Academie Julian and later under Paul Gauguin. He also studied at the Académie Vitti in Paris.

In 1896, he travelled to Florence, Siena, Rome and Naples to study early Renaissance art. In 1900, Halonen created two works for the Finnish Pavilion at the Exposition Universelle in Paris. In 1904, he traveled to Vienna to Florence by way of St. Petersburg.

In 1895, Pekka Halonen married a young music student, Maija Mäkinen. They had eight children: four sons and four daughters. Halonen died in Tuusula on 1 December 1933. He was buried at the Tuusula Church in Tuusula.

Style
Halonen chronicled the Finnish landscape and its people. He had an early interest in Symbolism, but Gauguin's decorative Synthetism, as well as Japanese woodcuts, had a deeper impression on his work.

Many of his paintings depict simple scenes from his everyday surroundings, such as Sauna in the Snow (1908), which vividly captures the stillness and subtle fragrance of freshly fallen snow. When at the beginning of the 20th century Finland's existence was threatened, Halonen strove to foster a sense of national pride through symbolic interpretations of the Finnish landscape.

Halonen stated that he never painted for anyone but himself. He felt that "Art should not jar the nerves like sandpaper – it should produce a feeling of peace."

Halosenniemi
In 1895, Halonen and his family settled down in a house with a studio on Lake Tuusula in Tuusula, Finland. Here the Halonen family lived in an imposing pinewood villa known as ‘Halosenniemi’. Halosenniemi was designed by Pekka Halonen himself and his brother Antti Halonen and was completed during the winter of 1901–02. Adjacent to the house, Halonen built a sauna, which in typical Finnish tradition also served as a laundry. The landscape near Halosenniemi was an important source of inspiration for his art. In Tuusula Halonen had a wide circle of artist friends and relatives which provided him with a daily source of social and cultural stimulation.

On the shores of the lake where he resided an artists' community flourished, helping to develop a sense of Finnish national identity. Halosenniemi was designed with the two-storey studios of Paris in mind, with high ceilings and tall windows in the studio, and second-floor living-quarters accessible by a set of stairs and a balcony that overlooked the studio.

The building is now a museum that includes original furnishings and Halonen's own art.

Selected works

See also
Golden Age of Finnish Art
Finnish art

References

External links 
Halosenniemi Museum website

1865 births
1933 deaths
People from Lapinlahti
People from Kuopio Province (Grand Duchy of Finland)
Académie Julian alumni
19th-century Finnish painters
20th-century Finnish painters
Finnish male painters
19th-century Finnish male artists
20th-century Finnish male artists